Momordicin I, or 3,7,23-trihydroxycucurbitan-5,24-dien-19-al, is a chemical compound found in the leaves of the bitter melon vine (Momordica charantia), possibly responsible for its reputed medicinal properties. 

The compound was isolated and characterized in 1984 by M. Yasuda and others   It is a white crystalline solid with formula , that melts at 125–128 °C.

The compound can be extracted from ground dry leaves by dichloromethane.  It is insoluble in water and soluble in methanol.

A related glycoside, momordicoside, occurs in the unripe fruit.

See also 
 Momordicin-28
 Momordicinin
 Momordicilin
 Momordenol
 Momordol

References 

Triterpenes
Aldehydes
Triols